Malu Mulher is a TV series broadcast by Rede Globo from May 24, 1979 to December 22, 1980, written and directed by Daniel Filho. The theme song, Começar de novo,  was a great hit in the voice of one of Brazil's greatest popular female singer, Simone.

Cast
Main roles
 Regina Duarte .... Malu
 Dênis Carvalho .... Pedro Henrique
 Narjara Turetta .... Elisa
 Antônio Petrin .... Gabriel Fonseca
 Sônia Guedes .... Elza
 Ricardo Petraglia .... Amorim
 Lúcia Alves .... Amorim's wife
 Ruthinéia de Moraes .... Vera
 Elza Gomes .... Alice
 Natália do Vale ....Malu's friend

Supporting roles
 Dina Sfat
 Mário Lago
 Lucélia Santos
 Ângela Leal
 Paulo Figueiredo
 Ney Latorraca

International repercussions 
Malu Mulher was broadcast to some 50 television channels in several countries. In 1979, it won the Ondas Award from the Spanish Broadcasting Society and Radio Barcelona. In 1980, he received the Iris Award for best foreign production shown on television in the United States. In the same year, it was broadcast in Sweden and exceeded in audience several BBC programmes in England. In 1982, it was considered the best television programme of the year in Portugal and Greece. The series continued to be exported even after it ended in Brazil. In Latin America, it faced problems with the censorship of some countries. In 1983, it went on air in Cuba. At the time, Brazilian entertainment productions for that country were still forbidden. In 1988, it was broadcast in France by Antenne 2 under the title Maria Lúcia. Regina Duarte won an award in the former Czechoslovakia for the episode "Parada Obrigatória". In the Netherlands, over one million viewers watched the first episode and about three million during six weeks.

References 

Rede Globo original programming
Brazilian drama television series
1979 Brazilian television series debuts
1980 Brazilian television series endings